Papanovka is a rural locality (a village) in Michurinsky Selsoviet, Sharansky District, Bashkortostan, Russia. The population was 90 as of 2010. There are 3 streets.

Geography 
Papanovka is located 30 km northeast of Sharan (the district's administrative centre) by road. Sokolovka is the nearest rural locality.

References 

Rural localities in Sharansky District